Athletics at the 2019 European Games took place at the Dinamo Stadium between 23 and 28 June 2019. For the first time in an international event, a new competition format called Dynamic New Athletics (DNA) was contested.

Qualification
The qualification list was based on the results from the 2017 European Team Championships. The top 30 teams will qualify, with each team consisting of 23 male and female athletes, including reserves.

 (host)

On 23 April, the Organising Committee announced that the DNA programme would involve 24 of the thirty teams, the other six having indicated they did not wish to take part. The absenting nations were:

Medal summary

Medal table

Medalists

References

External links
Full results
Medallists by Event 

 
Sports at the 2019 European Games
European Games
2019
European Games